The Key West Aquarium is the only public aquarium in Key West, Florida, United States. It is located at 1 Whitehead Street and is marked by Historic Marker 52.

History 

Built between 1932 and 1934, the Key West Aquarium is one of Florida's oldest aquariums. Original admission was 15 cents for adults and 5 cents for children. 

The aquarium was conceived by Dr. Robert Van Deusen, the Director of the Fairmount Park Aquarium in Philadelphia. The aquarium was originally an open air aquarium, one of the first and largest at the time.

During the Great Depression, Key West  turned over its charter to the federal government due to the economic disaster that hit the island. The federal government believed that Key West's weather and location would make it an ideal tourist destination. The Works Project Administration (WPA) was sent in and built the tourist attraction.

Exhibits 
The aquarium is home to exhibits on alligators, atlantic shore fish, jellyfish, sharks, sea turtles, and a touch tank.

Relevance in pop culture 
James Merrill wrote about the Key West Aquarium in his poem Key West Aquarium: The Sawfish.

References

External links

Aquaria in Florida
Aquarium
Aquarium
Aquarium
Aquarium
New Deal in Florida